This is a list of both production and concept vehicles of the Lincoln and Continental divisions of Ford Motor Company of the United States and Canada.  For other vehicles produced by Ford Motor Company see: List of Ford vehicles, List of Mercury vehicles, Edsel, Frontenac, Merkur, Meteor, Monarch.

Current production vehicles

Past models
 Lincoln Blackwood (2002)
 Lincoln Capri (1952–1959)
 Lincoln Continental (1939–1948, 1956–2002, 2017–2020)
 Lincoln Cosmopolitan (1949–1954)
 Lincoln Custom (1941–1942, 1955)
 Lincoln EL-series (1949–1951)
 Lincoln H-series (1946–1948)
 Lincoln K-series (1931–1940)
 Lincoln L-series (1922–1930)
 Lincoln Lido (1950–1951)
 Lincoln LS (2000–2006)
 Lincoln Mark series
 Continental Mark II (1956–1957)
 Continental Mark III (1969–1971)
 Continental Mark IV(1972–1976)
 Continental Mark V (1977–1979)
 Continental Mark VI (1980–1983)
 Continental Mark VII (1984–1985)
 Lincoln Mark VII (1986–1992)
 Lincoln Mark VIII (1993–1998)
 Lincoln Mark LT (USA 2006–2008; Mexico 2006–2014)
 Lincoln MKC (2014–2019)
 Lincoln MKS (2009–2016)
 Lincoln MKT (2010–2019)
 Lincoln MKX (2006–2018)
 Lincoln MKZ (2006–2020)
 Lincoln Premiere (1956–1960)
 Lincoln Town Car (1981–2011)
 Lincoln Versailles (1977–1980)
 Lincoln Zephyr V-12 (1936–1942)

Concept models

 Lincoln Continental 1950-X (1952)
 Lincoln Anniversary (1953)
 Lincoln Maharaja (1953)
 Lincoln XL-500 (1953)
 Lincoln Mardi Gras (1954)
 Lincoln Futura (1955)
 Lincoln Indianapolis (1955)
 Lincoln Continental Town Brougham (1964–1965)
 Lincoln Coronation (1966)
 Lincoln Coronation II (1967)
 Lincoln Continental Town Sedan (1969)
 Continental Mark III Dual Cowl Phaeton (1970)
 Lincoln Continental Concept 90 (1982)
 Lincoln Continental Concept 100 (1983)
 Lincoln Quicksilver Ghia (1983)
 Lincoln Vignale (1987)
 Lincoln Machete (1988)
 Lincoln Marque X (1992)
 Lincoln Contempra (1994)
 Lincoln L2K (1995)
 Lincoln Sentinel (1996)
 Lincoln Special LS (1999)
 Lincoln MK9 (2001)
 Lincoln Continental (2002)
 Lincoln Navicross (2003)
 Lincoln Mark X (2004)	
 Lincoln MKR (2007)
 Lincoln C (2009)
 Lincoln MKZ (2012)
 Lincoln MKC (2013)
 Lincoln Continental (2015)		
 Lincoln Aviator (2018)
 Lincoln Zephyr (2021)
 Lincoln Star (2022)
 Lincoln Model L100 (2022)

References

Lists of cars